The Rolex Trophy was a golf tournament on the Challenge Tour, that is played in Geneva, Switzerland. It was played annually on the Challenge Tour since 1989.

Unlike many Challenge Tour events, the Rolex Trophy has been played at the same venue, the Golf Club de Genève, every year. 

It is a limited field Pro-Am event.  It used to feature the top 32 in the tour rankings plus four invitees, but the number of players has more recently been 42.  One unusual feature was that only the prize money of the top 20 players counted towards their Challenge Tour rankings, although all entrants receive prize money.

Winners

Notes

See also
Omega European Masters – European Tour event held in Switzerland
Swiss Challenge – another Challenge Tour event held in Switzerland

External links

Coverage on the Challenge Tour's official site

Former Challenge Tour events
Golf tournaments in Switzerland
Pro–am golf tournaments
Recurring sporting events established in 1989
1989 establishments in Switzerland
Rolex sponsorships